Luke Cutts (born 13 February 1988 in Sheffield, South Yorkshire, England) is a British pole vaulter. His personal best of  set in 2014 is the British indoor record for the event. His outdoor best of  puts him third on the all-time British lists.

He represented Great Britain at the World Junior Championships in Athletics in 2006, the European Athletics Junior Championships in 2007, then won a silver medal at the 2009 European Athletics U23 Championships. At his first three senior international championships (2009 World Championships in Athletics, 2010 Commonwealth Games and 2012 European Athletics Championships) he failed to progress beyond the qualifying round. He quit work as an overnight labourer in a lorry depot to focus on pole vault full-time at the start of 2013 which brought an upturn in performances. He won the 2013 British Championship but was passed over for World Championship selection in favour of compatriot Steve Lewis. After a strong beginning to his indoor season in 2014 Cutts came back from a mid season neck injury to win a silver medal at the 2014 Commonwealth Games.

He represented Great Britain at the 2016 Summer Olympics in Rio de Janeiro, Brazil.

Career

Early career
He was born in the Sheffield; he began pole vaulting around 1999. In 2004 he was a junior champion in weightlifting.

An indoor clearance of  brought Cutts the British junior record for the event in February 2007. He was runner-up at the British Indoor Championships and the British Outdoor Championships that year, but in his sole international outing he failed to record a valid mark at the 2007 European Athletics Junior Championships. Cutts' training based at the Dearneside Leisure Centre with his coach Trevor Fox combined a variety of methods including: improving upper-body strength, speedwork, gymnastics and vaulting technique. Emphasising all-round athletic skills, his performances progressively improved.

2009–2013, British titles
Cutts made his breakthrough as a senior athlete in 2009. He was the silver medallist at the 2009 European Athletics U23 Championships with a new best of  behind the favourite Raphael Holzdeppe. He was fourth at the London Grand Prix but faltered at the 2009 World Championships in Athletics, as he vaulted only  and was eliminated in qualifying. His 2010 season also saw him perform poorly for Great Britain: after finishing third at the British indoor and outdoor championships he did not record a valid height at the Commonwealth Games.

Despite the attraction of qualifying for the 2012 London Olympics, Cutts did not recapture his best form in the 2012 season either. It was in 2013 that Cutts returned to his best form.

Cutts quit his work doing 10-hour night shifts loading lorries at a depot at the beginning of 2013 to allow himself to focus full-time on pole vaulting. Despite this, UK Athletics selected Lewis for the 2013 World Championships in Athletics instead. This decision attracted much criticism after Lewis finished last at the World Championships, failing to clear the bar.

2014–present, British record
Cutts established himself as the top British vaulter at the start of 2014. He took his first British indoor title shortly afterwards, beating Max Eaves. Cutts entered the 2014 IAAF World Indoor Championships as the second ranked athlete (Lavillenie was injured while Malte Mohr had cleared . However having suffered a neck injury Cutts couldn't reproduce his strong form from earlier in the year and finished 8th. His neck injury hindered Cutts' preparation for the outdoor season but he still managed to produce a jump of 5.55m at the Commonwealth Games to take a silver medal behind his domestic rival Steve Lewis.
At the 2016 Olympics, Cutts managed 5.45m to finish 12th in his qualifying pool.

References

External links
 
 
 
 
 
 
 

Living people
1988 births
Sportspeople from Sheffield
British male pole vaulters
English male pole vaulters
Olympic male pole vaulters
Olympic athletes of Great Britain
Athletes (track and field) at the 2016 Summer Olympics
Commonwealth Games medallists in athletics
Commonwealth Games silver medallists for England
Athletes (track and field) at the 2010 Commonwealth Games
Athletes (track and field) at the 2014 Commonwealth Games
Athletes (track and field) at the 2018 Commonwealth Games
World Athletics Championships athletes for Great Britain
British Athletics Championships winners
Medallists at the 2014 Commonwealth Games
Medallists at the 2018 Commonwealth Games